Lord George Augusta Hill (9 December 1801 – 6 April 1879) was an Anglo-Irish military officer, politician and landowner.

Hill was the posthumous son of Arthur Hill, 2nd Marquess of Downshire and his wife Mary Hill, Marchioness of Downshire, granddaughter of Samuel Sandys, 1st Baron Sandys. He was born three months after his father's death by suicide.

Military and political career
He entered the army in May 1817, initially a cornet in the Royal Horse Guards, promoted to lieutenant in 1820. He transferred to the Royal Irish Dragoons as a captain in 1825. In April 1830 he became aide-de-camp to Sir John Byng, Commander-in-Chief of the forces in Ireland, at the rank of major, but on 6 July he took half-pay.

In the 1830 general election, Hill was elected MP for Carrickfergus, unseating Sir Arthur Chichester, Bt. Hill's brother Arthur Hill, 3rd Marquess of Downshire was a minor landowner in Carrickfergus; Lord George had been proposed as a candidate there in the 1826 general election, but had withdrawn in Chichester's favour, stating that he had been unaware of the nomination.

Although he was considered a friend to the Duke of Wellington's Tory government when elected, he was absent from the vote of confidence on 15 November 1830 which caused the government to fall, and thereafter supported Earl Grey's government and its Reform Bill, like his brothers. Due to ill health, he did not contest the 1832 general election, instead supporting his brother Lord Marcus Hill, who was elected for Newry.

He served as Comptroller of the Household to the Lord Lieutenant of Ireland, 1833–34, and as High Sheriff of Donegal in 1845.

Gweedore
In 1838, Hill bought land in Gweedore, County Donegal, over the next few years expanding his holdings to 23,000 acres. Hill himself described the condition of the local population as "more deplorable than can well be conceived"; according to the schoolmaster Patrick McKye, they were in the "most needy, hungry and naked condition of any people". Among other improvements, he built a port, Bunbeg Harbour, to encourage fishing, improved the roads and other infrastructure, and constructed the Gweedore Hotel to attract wealthy tourists.

However, his attempts to reform local farming practices, in particular, his suppression of the rundale system of shared landholding, proved unpopular and controversial. While his reforms may have protected Gweedore from the worst effects of the Great Famine of the 1840s – the local population did not decrease, as it did elsewhere in Ireland – Hill's attitude to the famine was uncompromising and unsympathetic:

Hill's book Facts from Gweedore (1845) provides an account of conditions in Gweedore and seeks to explain and justify Hill's agricultural reforms. It ran to five editions and played a large part in the bitter public debates about the effects of Irish landlordism. In June 1858 Hill gave evidence to a House of Commons select committee on Irish poverty; the committee was critical of Hill's actions.

He died at his residence, Ballyare House in Ramelton, in April 1879. He was buried at Conwal Parish Church in Letterkenny, alongside the first Austen to whom he was married.

Family
Hill was twice married, to two sisters, daughters of Edward Austen Knight (brother of Jane Austen).

On 21 October 1834, he married Cassandra Jane Knight (16 November 1806 – 14 March 1842). They had four children:
 Norah Mary Elizabeth Hill (12 December 1835 – 24 April 1920)
 Captain Arthur Blundell George Sandys Hill (13 May 1837 – 16 June 1923)
 Augustus Charles Edward Hill (9 March 1839 – 9 December 1908)
 Cassandra Jane Louisa Hill (12 March 1842 – 16 August 1901)

On 11 May 1847, he married Louisa Knight (13 November 1804 – 29 July 1889), niece and god-daughter of Jane Austen. She had moved to Ireland after Cassandra's death to look after the children; the marriage prompted a parliamentary investigation into the legality of a marriage between a widower and his deceased wife's sister. They had one son:
 George Marcus Wandsbeck Hill (9 April 1849 – 22 March 1911)

References

External links
 (no contributions recorded)

1801 births
1879 deaths
High Sheriffs of Donegal
Royal Horse Guards officers
4th Royal Irish Dragoon Guards officers
UK MPs 1830–1831
UK MPs 1831–1832
Whig (British political party) MPs for Irish constituencies
Younger sons of marquesses
Younger sons of barons